The 1986 Sacramento State Hornets football team represented California State University, Sacramento as a member of the Western Football Conference (WFC) during the 1986 NCAA Division II football season. Led by ninth-year head coach Bob Mattos, Sacramento State compiled an overall record of 6–4–1 with a mark of 5–1 in conference play, winning the WFC title. The team outscored its opponents 308 to 268 for the season. The Hornets played home games at Hornet Stadium in Sacramento, California.

Schedule

Team players in the NFL
The following Sacramento State players were selected in the 1987 NFL Draft.

The following finished their college career in 1986, were not drafted, but played in the NFL.

References

Sacramento State
Sacramento State Hornets football seasons
Western Football Conference champion seasons
Sacramento State Hornets football